Dog Tales is a weekly half-hour syndicated documentary television series which features stories and news about all types of dogs and dog lovers. It is produced by Alex Paen, and distributed by Storrs Media/Telco Productions, Inc.

References

External links

American documentary television series
Television shows about dogs
Television series by Tribune Entertainment